The men's artistic individual all-around competition at the 1956 Summer Olympics was held at the West Melbourne Stadium from 3 to 7 December. It was the twelfth appearance of the event. There were 63 competitors from 18 nations, with each nation entering up to 6 gymnasts. The event was won by Viktor Chukarin of the Soviet Union, the second man to successfully defend an all-around title (after Alberto Braglia in 1908 and 1912) and fourth to earn multiple medals of any color. His countryman Yury Titov took bronze. Takashi Ono of Japan earned silver. It was the first medal in the event for Japan, beginning that nation's nearly four-decade battle with the Soviet Union for dominance. Every men's all-around medal from 1956 to 1976 was won by a gymnast from one of those two nations; from 1952 to 1988, the Soviets won six of the ten gold medals while Japan won the other four.

Background
This was the 12th appearance of the men's individual all-around. The first individual all-around competition had been held in 1900, after the 1896 competitions featured only individual apparatus events. A men's individual all-around has been held every Games since 1900.

Three of the top 10 gymnasts from the 1952 Games returned: gold medalist Viktor Chukarin of the Soviet Union, fourth-place finisher Valentin Muratov of the Soviet Union, and ninth-place finisher Helmut Bantz of Germany. Chukarin and Muratov had tied for the World Championship in 1954.

Australia made its debut in the event. East and West Germany competed together as the United Team of Germany for the first time. France made its 10th appearance, tying the absent Italy for most among nations.

Competition format

The gymnastics format continued to use the aggregation format, mostly following the scoring tweaks made in 1952. Each nation entered either a team of six gymnasts or up to three individual gymnasts. All entrants in the gymnastics competitions performed both a compulsory exercise and a voluntary exercise for each apparatus. The 12 exercise scores were summed to give an individual all-around total.

No separate finals were contested.

Exercise scores ranged from 0 to 10, apparatus scores from 0 to 20, and individual totals from 0 to 120.

Schedule

All times are Australian Eastern Standard Time (UTC+10)

Results

The results of the competition are shown below.

References

Men's artistic individual all-around
1956
Men's events at the 1956 Summer Olympics